This list of mines in Poland is subsidiary to the list of mines article and lists working, defunct and future mines in the country and is organised by the primary mineral output. For practical purposes stone, marble and other quarries may be included in this list.

Coal
Adamów Coal Mine
Bełchatów Coal Mine
Bielszowice Coal Mine
Bogdanka Coal Mine
Bolesław Śmiały Coal Mine
Borynia Coal Mine
Budryk Coal Mine
Chwałowice Coal Mine
Drzewce Coal Mine
Dęby Szlacheckie Coal Mine
Gubin Coal Mine
Halemba Coal Mine
Janina Coal Mine
Jankowice Coal Mine
Jas-Mos Coal Mine
Jóźwin Coal Mine
Konin Coal Mine
Krupiński Coal Mine
Legnica Coal Mine
Mosty Coal Mine
Murcki Coal Mine
Mysłowice-Wesoła Coal Mine
Piaski Coal Mine
Piast Coal Mine
Pniówek Coal Mine
Sobieski Coal Mine
Sośnica-Makoszowy Coal Mine
Staszic Coal Mine
Szczygłowice Coal Mine
Tomisławice Coal Mine
Trzcianka Coal Mine
Turów Coal Mine
Wujek Coal Mine
Ziemowit Coal Mine
Zofiówka Coal Mine

Copper
Bytom Odrzański mine
Gaworzyce mine
Głogów Głęboki-Przemysłowy mine
Lubin mine
Myszków mine
Polkowice-Sieroszowice mine
Retków mine

Limestone
Kujawy mine

Nickel
Szklary mine

Salt
Bochnia Salt Mine
Wieliczka Salt Mine

References 

Poland